Tic Toc Airport is an isolated airstrip on an inlet off the Gulf of Corcovado in the Los Lagos Region of Chile. The nearest community is Puerto Raúl Marín Balmaceda (es)  to the south.

There is mountainous terrain east through south of the runway, and rising terrain in all quadrants except west, over the gulf.

See also

Transport in Chile
List of airports in Chile

References

External links
OpenStreetMap - Tic Toc
OurAirports - Tic Toc
FallingRain - Tic Toc Airport

Airports in Chile
Airports in Los Lagos Region